Light reaction may refer to:
 Light-dependent reactions
 Pupillary light reflex